Peter Zanter (born 11 November 1965) is a German football coach and former player who played as a defender As a player, he spent eight seasons in the Bundesliga with Bayer Leverkusen, Hannover 96, and VfL Bochum, but had to give up his playing career early because of an injury.

Honours
Bayer Leverkusen
 UEFA Cup: 1987–88

References

External links
 

1965 births
Living people
German footballers
Association football defenders
Germany under-21 international footballers
UEFA Cup winning players
Bundesliga players
Bayer 04 Leverkusen players
Hannover 96 players
VfL Bochum players
SV 19 Straelen players
Eintracht Braunschweig non-playing staff
Place of birth missing (living people)